Thomas Poynton (born 25 November 1989) is an English former cricketer who played for Derbyshire. He is a right-handed batsman and a wicket-keeper.

Poynton made his County Championship debut in July 2007, against Middlesex, having represented the team three times during the 2006 Second XI Championship season. Poynton made two appearances in the Twenty20 Cup and six appearances in the Pro40 competition. Poynton has also made six appearances for the England U19s, playing against South Africa and Bangladesh.

In 2014, Poynton was involved in a car crash in which his father was killed and he sustained an injury to his ankle. The injury forced Poynton to retire from cricket in July 2016.

References

1989 births
Living people
English cricketers
Derbyshire cricketers
People educated at Repton School
English cricketers of the 21st century
Sportspeople from Burton upon Trent